Harold William Fraser (October 26, 1872 – January 4, 1945) was an American golfer who competed in the 1904 Summer Olympics. In 1904 he was part of the American team which won the bronze medal. In the individual competition he finished 29th in the qualification and was eliminated in the first round of the match play.

He was born in Windsor, Ontario and died in Ottawa Hills, Ohio.

References

External links
 Profile

American male golfers
Amateur golfers
Golfers at the 1904 Summer Olympics
Olympic bronze medalists for the United States in golf
Medalists at the 1904 Summer Olympics
Sportspeople from Windsor, Ontario
1872 births
1945 deaths